Cosmos Cubed is a role-playing game adventure published by TSR in 1988 for the Marvel Super Heroes role-playing game.

Contents
Cosmos Cubed is a scenario for the Advanced rules: Thor, Firelord, Dr. Strange, and the Silver Surfer have been summoned by the Watcher. They must get hold of the new Cosmic Cube before it can fall into the hands of the Kree or the Skrulls. It includes statistics for the Inhumans and the Elders of the Universe.

Publication history
ME1 Cosmos Cubed was written by Troy Denning, with a cover by Jeff Butler, and was published by TSR, Inc., in 1988 as a 32-page book, a 16-page book, a large color map, and an outer folder.

Reception

Reviews

References

Marvel Comics role-playing game adventures
Role-playing game supplements introduced in 1988